Gerald Allen "Tex" Oliver (November 21, 1899 – April 10, 1988) was an American football coach.  He served as the head coach at the University of Arizona from 1933 to 1937 and at the University of Oregon from 1938 to 1941 and again from 1945 to 1946.

Coaching career
From 1933 to 1937, Oliver coached the Arizona Wildcats to a 32–11–4 record. During that stretch, he never had a losing season. From 1938 to 1946, he coached the Oregon Webfoots to a 23–28–3 record.

Later life and death
After retiring from coaching, Oliver worked as a school administrator in Compton and Lancaster, California.  He retired as superintendent of schools in Lancaster in 1966.  Oliver died of cancer on April 10, 1988 at his home in Costa Mesa, California.

Head coaching record

College

See also
 List of college football head coaches with non-consecutive tenure

References

External links
 

1899 births
1988 deaths
School superintendents in California
Arizona Wildcats football coaches
Oregon Ducks football coaches
Saint Mary's Pre-Flight Air Devils football coaches
High school football coaches in California
Fullerton Hornets football coaches
University of Southern California alumni
Deaths from cancer in California